Methodist-Protestant Church at Fisher's Landing, also known as the United Methodist Church, is a historic Methodist church located at Orleans in Jefferson County, New York. It was built in 1898 and is a wood-frame vernacular Queen Anne structure.  It features carefully crafted Palladian windows with stained glass panes and wooden frame and mullions.  It is a seasonally utilized church structure.

It was listed on the National Register of Historic Places in 1996.

References

Churches on the National Register of Historic Places in New York (state)
Methodist churches in New York (state)
Queen Anne architecture in New York (state)
Churches completed in 1898
19th-century Methodist church buildings in the United States
Churches in Jefferson County, New York
1898 establishments in New York (state)
National Register of Historic Places in Jefferson County, New York